Samuel Kurtz Hoffman (15 April 1902 – 26 June 1995) was an American engineer who specialised in rocket propulsion.

He served as chief engineer at engine manufacturing firm Lycoming Engines and later became professor of aerospace engineering at Pennsylvania State University, his alma mater.

While leading a team at North American Aviation (which later became Rocketdyne) between 1949 and 1970 he developed the F-1 engines that would power the Saturn V rocket, and later worked on the Space Shuttle Main Engine.

References

1902 births
1995 deaths
20th-century American Jews
Pennsylvania State University alumni
American aerospace engineers
Pennsylvania State University faculty
20th-century American engineers
Burials at Santa Barbara Cemetery